Henry Allen (1879–1939) was an English footballer who played in the Football League for Derby County and Leicester Fosse. He was a member of the Derby team which lost 4–1 to Sheffield United in the 1899 FA Cup Final.

References

1879 births
1939 deaths
English footballers
Association football forwards
English Football League players
Derby County F.C. players
Leicester City F.C. players
FA Cup Final players